Eternal Academy was a French esports team for the video game Overwatch competing in Overwatch Contenders (OWC) and an academy team for the Paris Eternal of the Overwatch League (OWL). The team is based in Paris, France and plays in the Europe region of OWC.

Franchise history 
On 27 February 2019, the Paris Eternal announced their Overwatch Contenders academy team as Eternal Academy. They began in the Europe region of Contenders in 2019 Season 1, led by head coach Johan "CWoosH" Klingestedt.

In their first season, Eternal heavily struggled and was only able to amass a 2–5 regular season record, placing last in Europe. Due to their poor performance, they were relegated to Contenders Trials and had to perform well enough to get promoted back into Contenders for 2019 Season 2. However, they failed to qualify for Contenders, marking the first time that an academy failed to do so. Following, Paris Eternal announced that they would be dropping their academy team, making Eternal Academy the third academy team to drop out of Contenders.

Six months later, on 13 December 2019, Eternal Academy announced that they would be competing in Contenders 2020 Season 1.

Seasons overview

Current roster

OWL buyouts and promotions 
All Overwatch Contenders players are eligible to be promoted by their affiliated Overwatch League team or signed to any other Overwatch League during specified non-blackout periods.

References 

Esports teams based in France
2019 establishments in France
Esports teams established in 2019
Paris Eternal
Defunct and inactive Overwatch League academy teams
Esports teams disestablished in 2020